Traverhyphes is a genus of little stout crawler mayflies in the family Leptohyphidae. There are about seven described species in Traverhyphes.

Species
These seven species belong to the genus Traverhyphes:
 Traverhyphes chiquitano Molineri, 2004
 Traverhyphes frevo Lima, Salles & Pinheiro, 2011
 Traverhyphes indicator (Needham & Murphy, 1924)
 Traverhyphes nanus (Allen, 1967)
 Traverhyphes pirai Molineri, 2001
 Traverhyphes yuati Molineri, 2004
 Traverhyphes yuqui Molineri, 2004

References

Further reading

 
 

Mayflies
Articles created by Qbugbot